Privatization in Poland includes:

1996 Polish referendums, a double referendum on enfranchisement and state property
Balcerowicz Plan, method for rapidly transitioning from an economy based on state ownership and central planning, to a capitalist market economy
Powszechny Zakład Ubezpieczeń, a publicly traded insurance company

Privatization in Poland
Privatization by country